Aleksandr Mikhailovich Galimov (born 9 February 2000) is a Russian football player who plays for Shinnik Yaroslavl.

Club career
He made his debut in the Russian Professional Football League for FC Ural-2 Yekaterinburg on 10 October 2018 in a game against FC Syzran-2003.

On 5 July 2019, Galimov joined FC Pyunik on loan.

References

External links
 
 
 

2000 births
Living people
Russian footballers
Association football midfielders
FC Ural Yekaterinburg players
FC Pyunik players
FC Yenisey Krasnoyarsk players
FC SKA-Khabarovsk players
FC Shinnik Yaroslavl players
Armenian Premier League players
Russian First League players
Russian Second League players
Russian expatriate footballers
Expatriate footballers in Armenia
Russian expatriate sportspeople in Armenia